Chennai Super Kings (CSK) is the franchise cricket team based in Chennai, Tamil Nadu, India, which has been playing in the Indian Premier League (IPL) since the first edition of the tournament in 2008. They were one of the eight teams to compete in the 2021 Indian Premier League. The Super Kings have previously lifted the IPL title thrice (in 2010, 2011 and 2018). In the final, they beat Kolkata Knight Riders to win their fourth IPL title.

Background
Chennai Super Kings kicked off 2021 season by releasing 6 players on 20 January after that they traded inRobin Uthappa from Rajasthan Royals and looking ready for Auction at 18 February with Rs 19.90 crores left in purse.

Slots left : 6 (5 Indians) (1 Overseas).

Retained Players : MS Dhoni (c), Suresh Raina (Vc), Faf du Plessis, Ravindra Jadeja, Mitchell Santner, Lungi Ngidi, Ambati Rayudu, Narayan Jagadeeshan, KM Asif, Shardul Thakur, Imran Tahir, Ruturaj Gaikwad, Deepak Chahar, Karn Sharma, Dwayne Bravo, Sam Curran, Josh Hazlewood, Ravisrinivasan Sai Kishore, Robin Uthappa(Traded).

Released Players : Murali Vijay, Piyush Chawla, Kedar Jadhav, Harbhajan Singh, Monu Kumar, Shane Watson(Retired).

Auctioned Players : Moeen Ali, Cheteshwar Pujara, Krishnappa Gowtham, Hari Nishanth, Bhagath Varma, Harishankar Reddy.

 Supportive Players : Hardus Viljoen, Fazalhaq Farooqi,  Noor Ahmad, Matheesha Pathirana, Maheesh Theekshana added for training camp.

COVID-19 impact 
On 3 May 2021 three non-playing members of the team tested positive for COVID-19, including bowling coach Lakshmipathy Balaji and CEO Kasi Vishwanathan.

Squad 
 Players with international caps are listed in bold.
{| class="wikitable"  style="font-size:85%;"
|-
!No.
!Name
!Nationality
!Birth date
!Batting style
!Bowling style
!Year signed
!Salary
!Notes
|-
! colspan="9"  style=text-align:center;"| Batsmen
|-
|13|| Faf du Plessis ||  ||  || Right-handed || Right-arm leg break || style="text-align:center;"| 2018 || style="text-align:right;"|  || Overseas
|-
|9|| Ambati Rayudu ||  ||  || Right-handed || Right-arm off break || style="text-align:center;"| 2018 || style="text-align:right;"| ||
|-
|3|| Suresh Raina ||   ||  || Left-handed || Right-arm off break || style="text-align:center;"| 2018 || style="text-align:right;"|  || Vice Captain
|-
|25|| Cheteshwar Pujara ||  ||  || Right-handed || Right-arm leg break || style="text-align:center;"| 2021 || style="text-align:right;"|  ||
|-
|31|| Ruturaj Gaikwad ||  ||  || Right-handed || Right-arm off break || style="text-align:center;"| 2019 || style="text-align:right;"|  ||
|-
|16|| Chezhian Harinishanth ||  ||  || Left-handed || Right-arm off break || style="text-align:center;"| 2021 || style="text-align:right;"|  ||
|-
! colspan="9"  style="background:#dcdcdc; text-align:center;"| All-rounders
|-
|47|| Dwayne Bravo ||  ||  || Right-handed || Right-arm fast-medium || style="text-align:center;"| 2018 || style="text-align:right;"|  || Overseas
|-
|10|| Moeen Ali ||  ||  || Left-handed || Right-arm Off-break || style="text-align:center;"| 2021 || style="text-align:right;"|  || Overseas
|-
|79|| Krishnappa Gowtham ||  ||  || Right-handed || Right-arm Off-break || style="text-align:center;"| 2021 || style="text-align:right;"|  ||
|-
|8|| Ravindra Jadeja ||  ||  || Left-handed || Slow left-arm orthodox || style="text-align:center;"| 2018 || style="text-align:right;"|  ||  
|-
|74|| Mitchell Santner ||  ||  || Left-handed || Slow left-arm orthodox || style="text-align:center;"| 2018 || style="text-align:right;"|  || Overseas
|-
|58|| Sam Curran ||  ||  || Left-handed || Left-arm fast-medium || style="text-align:center;"| 2020 || style="text-align:right;"|  || Overseas
|-
|27|| Bhagath Varma ||  ||  || Right-handed || Right-arm Off-break || style="text-align:center;"| 2021 || style="text-align:right;"|  ||
|-
! colspan="9"  style="background:#dcdcdc; text-align:center;"| Wicket-keepers
|-
|7|| MS Dhoni ||  ||  || Right-handed || Right-arm medium-fast  || style="text-align:center;"| 2018 || style="text-align:right;"| || Captain
|-
|77|| Robin Uthappa ||  ||  || Right-handed || Right-arm off break || style="text-align:center;"| 2021 || style="text-align:right;"|  ||
|-
|18|| Narayan Jagadeesan ||  ||  || Right-handed || || style="text-align:center;"| 2018 || style="text-align:right;"|  || 
|-
! colspan="9"  style="background:#dcdcdc; text-align:center;"| Spin Bowlers
|-
|99|| Imran Tahir ||  ||  || Right-handed || Right-arm leg break || style="text-align:center;"| 2018 || style="text-align:right;"|  || Overseas
|-
|36|| Karn Sharma ||  ||  || Left-handed || Right-arm leg break || style="text-align:center;"| 2018 || style="text-align:right;"|  ||
|-
|96|| R Sai Kishore ||  ||  || Left-handed || Slow left-arm orthodox || style="text-align:center;"| 2020 || style="text-align:right;"|  ||
|-
! colspan="9"  style="background:#dcdcdc; text-align:center;"| Pace Bowlers
|-
|5|| Jason Behrendorff ||  ||  || Right-handed || Left-arm fast-medium || style="text-align:center;"| 2021 || style="text-align:right;"|  || Overseas, Replacement for Josh Hazlewood
|-
|38|| Josh Hazlewood ||  ||  || Left-handed || Right-arm fast-medium || style="text-align:center;"| 2020 || style="text-align:right;"|  || Overseas
|-
|54|| Shardul Thakur ||  ||  || Right-handed || Right-arm fast-medium || style="text-align:center;"| 2018 || style="text-align:right;"|  ||
|-
|90|| Deepak Chahar ||  ||  || Right-handed || Right-arm fast-medium || style="text-align:center;"| 2018 || style="text-align:right;"|  ||
|-
|24|| KM Asif ||  ||  || Right-handed || Right-arm fast-medium || style="text-align:center;"| 2018 || style="text-align:right;"|  ||
|-
|22|| Lungi Ngidi ||  ||  || Right-handed || Right-arm fast || style="text-align:center;"| 2018 || style="text-align:right;"|  || Overseas
|-
|46|| Harishankar Reddy ||  ||  || Right-handed || Right-arm fast-medium || style="text-align:center;"| 2021 || style="text-align:right;"|  ||
|-
! colspan="11" style="text-align:center;"| Source:CSK Players
|}

Administration and support staff

Kit manufacturers and sponsors

|

Teams and standings
 Results by match 

League table

League stage

The full schedule was published on the IPL website on 7 March 2021.

 Matches 

Playoffs

Qualifier 1

 Final 

Statistics
Most runs

Ruturaj Gaikwad won the Orange Cap award as the player who scored the highest number of runs in the tournament
 Source: '''Cricinfo

Most wickets

 Source: Cricinfo

Awards and achievements
The following players won player of the match awards whilst playing for the team:

References

Cricket teams in India
2021 Indian Premier League
Chennai Super Kings seasons